Youngor Arena is an indoor sporting arena located in Ningbo, China.  The capacity of the arena is 5,000 spectators and opened in 1994.  It hosts indoor sporting events such as basketball and volleyball.  It hosts the Bayi Rockets of the Chinese Basketball Association.

References

Indoor arenas in China
Sports venues in Zhejiang